The following highways are numbered 173:

Canada
Prince Edward Island Route 173
  Quebec Route 173

India
 National Highway 173 (India)

Ireland
 R173 road

Japan
 Japan National Route 173

Korea, South
 Iksan–Pyeongtaek Expressway Branch

Philippines
 National Route 173 (Philippines)

United States
 Alabama State Route 173
 Arizona State Route 173 (former)
 California State Route 173
 Connecticut Route 173
 Florida State Road 173
 Georgia State Route 173
 Illinois Route 173
 Iowa Highway 173
 K-173 (Kansas highway)
 Kentucky Route 173
 Louisiana Highway 173
 Maine State Route 173
 Maryland Route 173
 M-173 (Michigan highway) (former)
 Missouri Route 173
 New Jersey Route 173
 New Mexico State Road 173
 New York State Route 173
 Ohio State Route 173
 Oregon Route 173
 Pennsylvania Route 173
 South Carolina Highway 173
 Tennessee State Route 173
 Texas State Highway 173
 Texas State Highway Loop 173
 Farm to Market Road 173 (Texas)
 Utah State Route 173
 Virginia State Route 173
 Washington State Route 173
 Wisconsin Highway 173
 Wyoming Highway 173
Territories
 Puerto Rico Highway 173